Myroides phaeus is a bacterium from the genus of Myroides which has been isolated from human saliva.

References

Flavobacteria
Bacteria described in 2012